Elizabeth Venter (born 9 December 1938), known as Rina Venter, was the 
Minister of National Health and Population Development of South Africa, from 1989 to 1994.

Venter graduated from Pretoria University and was a social worker for 20 years. She served in the National Party government of F. W. de Klerk, and was the first woman in South African history to hold a cabinet post. She retired from politics in 1994.

Desegregation 
On 17 May 1990, Venter announced that South Africa's health system would begin desegregation. South Africa's 240 state hospitals became available to all races, although with less-than-optimal implementation.

Anti-tobacco 
Under pressure from opposition political parties, Venter publicly committed in 1991 to investigate tobacco legislation. The Apartheid government had vested interests in the tobacco industry, and would therefore be reluctant to introduce restrictions, so she enlisted the help of the civil society Tobacco Action Group, in order to bolster media and public support for anti-smoking efforts. 

After consulting with pro- and anti-tobacco lobbyists, Venter decided to introduce the Control of Smoking and Advertising of Tobacco Products Draft Bill, which would give her the power to restrict smoking in certain public places, would make it an offense to sell cigarettes to people under 16, and would further introduce restrictions such as health warnings on advertisements for tobacco products. 

The bill reemerged in 1992 as the Tobacco Products Control Bill, and was delayed until 1993 by the government. It was finally approved by Parliament on 17 June 1993.

Venter received recognition for her work to curb tobacco use with an award by the American Cancer Society.

HIV/AIDS 
Her department formulated a comprehensive and detailed plan for responding to the nascent AIDS pandemic, which was however hampered by lack of funding. She has criticized her successors for abandoning this plan.

References

Living people
Afrikaner people
Health ministers of South Africa
1938 births
National Party (South Africa) politicians
Women government ministers of South Africa
Place of birth missing (living people)